Parliamentary elections were held in Tunisia on 26 October 2014. Campaigning started on 4 October 2014. They were the first free regular legislative elections since independence in 1956, and the first elections held following the adoption of the new constitution in January 2014, which created a 217-seat Assembly of the Representatives of the People. 
According to preliminary results, Nidaa Tounes gained a plurality of votes, winning 85 seats in the 217-seat parliament, beating the Ennahda Movement (69 seats) and many smaller parties.

Presidential elections were held a month later on 23 November.

Electoral system
The 217 members of the Assembly of the Representatives of the People were elected in 33 constituencies. There were 27 multi-member constituencies in Tunisia varying in size from four to ten seats and electing a total of 199. There were also six overseas constituencies electing a total of 18 seats: two constituencies in France electing five seats each, one three-seat constituency in Italy, a single-member constituency in Germany, a two-member constituency covering the rest of Europe and the Americas, and a two-member constituency covering the Arab world and the rest of the world. Seats were elected by party-list proportional representation, using the largest remainder method.

Opinion polls
Poll results are listed in the table below in chronological order, showing the most recent polls last.

Results
According to the final results released by the Independent High Authority for Elections, Nidaa Tounes took the lead in the election, winning 86 seats in the 217-seat parliament. Ennahda Movement came second with 69 seats losing 16 seats compared to 2011 elections. The biggest losers were CPR of Moncef Marzouki and Democratic Forum for Labour and Liberties who were members of a coalition government formed with Ennahda Movement following 2011 elections, and opposition party Current of Love (formerly Aridha Chaabia). On the other hand, there was a noticeable emergence of smaller parties like the UPL of businessman Slim Riahi with 16 seats,  Popular Front with 15 seats and Afek Tounes with 8 seats.

Initially, the Elections Authority decided to sanction Nidaa Tounes in Kasserine electoral district by withdrawing one seat following reported irregularities conducted by partisans. However, the decision was overturned by the administrative court after an appeal by Nidaa Tounes. The ruling took away the only seat obtained by Democratic Forum for Labour and Liberties leaving the party with no presence in parliament.

Reactions

Domestic
Ennahda's Lotfi Zitoun said the party had "accepted this result and congratulate[s] the winner."

International
The result was hailed internationally for its democratic viability as the only one of the major Arab Spring uprisings, including Libya and Egypt, that is not convulsed by instability and turmoil.

In the United States, President Barack Obama hailed the free, fair and non-violent elections as a "milestone," while Secretary of State John Kerry said it was an example of "why Tunisia remains a beacon of hope, not only to the Tunisian people, but to the region and the world."

Other
Comparisons were also drawn to holding Tunisia as a model for Lebanon amidst its own turmoil.

Government formation
With Nidaa Tounes having won a plurality it had the right to name a prime minister and form a government in coalition. Beji Caid Essebsi said it was too early to talk of a coalition government – including one with Ennahda. Instead he said the 2014 Tunisian presidential election will give direction to the formation of a new government.

On 5 January 2015, Nidaa Tounes nominated independent Habib Essid as Prime Minister and asked him to form a new government. He was chosen over former trade unionist Taieb Baccouche "because he is independent and has experience in the areas of security and the economy," said the speaker of Congress, Mohamed Ennaceur. The nomination of a politician who had served under former autocratic president Zine el-Abidine Ben Ali however was widely criticized. Popular Front leader Hamma Hammami stated that with Essid as prime minister, "the real power" would rather be in the presidential palace.

On 23 January 2015, Essid surprisingly presented a minority cabinet including 10 ministers from Nidaa Tounes and three from the liberal Free Patriotic Union, after the other liberal power Afek Tounes was said to have abruptly pulled out of the coalition. Without Afek Tounes, the two parties could, however, only count on 102 of the 217 seats. Both Ennahda and the Popular Front announced to vote against the proposed government.

On 4 February 2015, Essid proposed a unity government consisting of independent politicians, ministers of Nidaa Tounes, the two liberal parties UPL and Afek Tounes, and a minister of the Islamist Ennahda. The next day, Essid's new proposal found a strong majority in the Assembly of the Representatives of the People, when 166 of the 217 legislators approved his new government.

The government lasted until new elections were held in October 2019; a new government formed in February 2020.

References

Elections in Tunisia
Tunisia
parliamentary election
October 2014 events in Africa